Gregor von Rezzori (May 13, 1914 – April 23, 1998), born Gregor Arnulph Herbert Hilarius von Rezzori d’Arezzo, was an Austrian-born, Romanian,  German-language novelist, memoirist, screenwriter and author of radio plays, as well as an actor, journalist, visual artist, art critic and art collector. He was fluent in German, Romanian, Italian, Polish, Ukrainian, Yiddish, French, and English; during his life, von Rezzori was successively a citizen of Austria-Hungary, Romania, and the Soviet Union, before becoming a stateless person and spending his final years as a citizen of Austria. He married Beatrice Monti della Corte.

Biography
Gregor von Rezzori was born in Czernowitz, Bukovina, part of Austria-Hungary at the time (1914). He originated from an Italian aristocratic family from the Province of Ragusa who had settled in Vienna by the mid-18th century. His father was an Austrian civil servant based in Czernowitz. The family remained in the region after it became part of the Romanian Kingdom in 1919, and the young Gregor von Rezzori became a Romanian citizen.

After World War I von Rezzori studied in colleges in Braşov, Fürstenfeld and Vienna. He began studying mining at the University of Leoben, then architecture and medicine at the University of Vienna, where he eventually graduated in arts.

In mid-1930 he moved to Bucharest, took up military service in the Romanian Army, and made a living as an artist. In 1938 he moved to Berlin, where he became active as a novelist, journalist, writer in radio broadcasting, and film production. Given his Romanian citizenship, von Rezzori was not drafted into the Wehrmacht during World War II.

Until the mid-1950s, he worked as an author at the broadcasting company Nordwestdeutscher Rundfunk. He regularly published novels and stories, as well as working in film production as a screenplay author and actor (starring alongside actors such as Brigitte Bardot, Jeanne Moreau, Anna Karina, Marcello Mastroianni or Charles Aznavour). Beginning in the early 1960s, Rezzori lived between Rome and Paris, with sojourns in the United States, eventually settling in Tuscany.

Besides writing and performing, he and his spouse Beatrice Monti della Corte were significant art collectors, and together founded the Santa Maddalena Retreat for Writers. He died in Santa Maddalena, part of Florence's Donnini frazione.

Literary works
Rezzori began his career as a writer of light novels, but he first encountered success in 1953 with the Maghrebinian Tales, a suite of droll stories and anecdotes from an imaginary land called "Maghrebinia", which reunited in a grotesque and parodic key traits of his multicultural Bukovinian birthplace, of extinct Austria-Hungary and of Bucharest of his youth. Over the years, Rezzori published further Maghrebinian Tales, which increased his reputation of language virtuosity and free spirit, writing with wit, insight and elegance.

Other books, such as The Death of My Brother Abel, Oedipus at Stalingrad, or The Snows of Yesteryear, recording the fading world at the time of the World Wars, have been celebrated for their powerful descriptive prose, nuance and style.

Rezzori first came to the attention of English-speaking readers with the 1969 publication of the story "Memoirs of an Anti-Semite" in The New Yorker, On this occasion, Elie Wiesel, who was born in Bukovina's neighboring Maramureş, wrote:
"Rezzori addresses the major problems of our time, and his voice echoes with the disturbing and wonderful magic of a true storyteller."

The novel-length version of Memoirs of an Anti-Semite was published in Germany in 1979, with the English translation following in 1981. It received enthusiastic reviews from Christopher Lehmann-Haupt  and Stanley Kaufmann when originally published. It was reissued by New York Review Books in 2007, and Christopher Hitchens wrote in a retrospective review, "Gregor von Rezzori could claim the peculiar distinction of being one of the few survivors to treat this ultimate catastrophe in the mild language of understatement. This is what still gives his novel the power to shock."

Reissues of The Snows of Yesteryear and An Ermine in Czernopol followed in 2008 and 2012, respectively. In 2019 NYRB published The Death of My Brother Abel and its sequel Cain as a single volume. Elie Wiesel wrote of The Death of My Brother Abel, "If a great novel can be recognized by its obsessions, its characters and, above all, its tone, then The Death of My Brother Abel is unquestionably great. Rezzori addresses the major problems of our time, and his voice echoes with the disturbing and wonderful magic of the true storyteller."

Rezzori's  controversial description of Vladimir Nabokov's Lolita as "the only convincing love story of our century" appeared on the cover of the second Vintage International edition of the novel. It was attributed simply to "Vanity Fair", the magazine which published Rezzori's original review of the book, and Rezzori was not often heralded as the man behind the quote.

In his Guide for Idiots through German Society, von Rezzori also used his noted taste for satire. Although he was not unanimously perceived as a major author in the German-speaking area, his posthumous reception has arguably confirmed him among the most important modern German-language authors.

Published titles
Flamme, die sich verzehrt (Self-Extinguishing Flame, novel, 1939)
Rombachs einsame Jahre, (Rombach's Lonely Years, novel, 1942)
Rose Manzani (novel, 1944)
Maghrebinische Geschichten (Tales of Maghrebinia, 1953)
Ödipus siegt bei Stalingrad (Oedipus Prevails at Stalingrad, 1954)
Männerfibel, (A Primer on Men, 1955)
An Ermine in Czernopol novel ("The Hussar", 1958)
Idiotenführer durch die deutsche Gesellschaft. 1: Hochadel (An Idiot’s Guide through German Society. 1: Upper Nobility, 1962)
Idiotenführer durch die deutsche Gesellschaft. 2: Adel (An Idiot’s Guide through German Society. 2: Nobility, 1962)
Bogdan im Knoblauchwald. Ein maghrebinisches Märchen (Bogdan in the Garlic Forest. A Maghrebinian Tale, 1962)
Idiotenführer durch die deutsche Gesellschaft. 3: Schickeria (An Idiot’s Guide through German Society. 3: Glitterati, 1963)
Idiotenführer durch die deutsche Gesellschaft. 4: Prominenz (An Idiot’s Guide through German Society. 4: Notables, 1965)
Die Toten auf ihre Plätze. Tagebuch des Films Viva Maria (The Dead on Their Places. Journal of the Movie 'Viva Maria''', 1966)1001 Jahr Maghrebinien. Eine Festschrift (1967)Der Tod meines Bruders Abel (The Death of My Brother Abel, novel, 1976 in Germany; 1985 in U.S., reissued in 2019)Greif zur Geige, Frau Vergangenheit (Grab the Fiddle, Ms. Yesteryear, novel, 1978)Denkwürdigkeiten eines Antisemiten (Memoirs of an Anti-Semite, 1979 in Germany; 1981 in U.S., reissued in 2007)Der arbeitslose König. Maghrebinisches Märchen (The Jobless King: A Maghrebinian Tale, 1981)Kurze Reise übern langen Weg. Eine Farce (Short Trip on a Long Route: A Farce, 1986)Blumen im Schnee – Portraitstudien zu einer Autobiographie, die ich nie schreiben werde. Auch: Versuch der Erzählweise eines gleicherweise nie geschriebenen Bildungsromans (The Snows Of Yesteryear, autobiographical essays, 1989)Über dem Kliff (Beyond the Cliff, stories, 1991)Begegnungen (Encounters, 1992)Ein Fremder in Lolitaland. Ein Essay (A Stranger in Lolitaland, 1993), first published in English by Vanity FairGreisengemurmel. Ein Rechenschaftsbericht (Old Men's Mutterings: A Statement of Accounts, 1994)Italien, Vaterland der Legenden, Mutterland der Mythen. Reisen durch die europäischen Vaterländer oder wie althergebrachte Gemeinplätze durch neue zu ersetzen sind (1996)Frankreich. Gottesland der Frauen und der Phrasen. Reisen durch die europäischen Vaterländer oder wie althergebrachte Gemeinplätze durch neue zu ersetzen sind (1997)Mir auf der Spur (On My Own Traces, 1997)Kain. Das letzte Manuskript (posthumous novel, 2001)

Awards
Theodor-Fontane-Preis (1959)
Premio Scanno (1987)
Premio Boccaccio
Premio Lorenzo Il Magnifico

Filmography

ScreenwriterKopfjäger von Borneo, 1936Under the Stars of Capri, 1953Labyrinth, 1959Beloved Augustin, 1959
 Storm in a Water Glass (1960)Man nennt es Amore, 1961
 Beloved Impostor, 1961The Gentlemen, 1965A Degree of Murder, 1967

Actor
 She (1954, directed by Rolf Thiele) (with Marina Vlady, Walter Giller, Nadja Tiller) as Redakteur
  (1957, directed by Rolf Thiele) (with O. W. Fischer, Michael Ande, Nadja Tiller) as Lord Avon
 Paprika (1959, directed by ) (with Willy Hagara, Violetta Ferrari) as Tokasz, Ilonas Vater
 Labyrinth (1959, directed by Rolf Thiele) (with Nadja Tiller, Peter van Eyck, Amedeo Nazzari) as Schweizer Zöllner
 Adorable Arabella (1959, directed by Axel von Ambesser) (with Johanna von Koczian, Carlos Thompson, Hilde Hildebrand)
 Das Riesenrad (1961, directed by Géza von Radványi) (with Maria Schell, O. W. Fischer, Adrienne Gessner) as Graf Wallburg
 A Very Private Affair (1962, directed by Louis Malle) (with Brigitte Bardot, Marcello Mastroianni) as Gricha
 Destination Rome (1963, directed by Denys de La Patellière) (with Charles Aznavour, Arletty) as Sir Craven
 Games of Desire (1964, directed by Hans Albin and Peter Berneis) (with Ingrid Thulin, Claudine Auger, Paul Hubschmid)
 Un mari à prix fixe (1965, directed by Claude de Givray) (with Anna Karina, Roger Hanin) as Konrad Reinhoff
 Die Herren (1965, directed by Franz Seitz, Rolf Thiele, Alfred Weidenmann) as Onkel Grischa
 Viva Maria! (1965, directed by Louis Malle, and Jean-Claude Carrière) with Brigitte Bardot, Jeanne Moreau) as Diogène
 Man on Horseback (1969, directed by Volker Schlöndorff) (with David Warner, Anna Karina) as Kunz
 Ein bißchen Liebe (1974, directed by ) (with Brigitte Berger, Eva Maria Herzig)
 Le beau monde (1981, TV Movie, directed by Michel Polac) (with Fabrice Luchini, Judith Magre) as Eric (final film role)

See also
Premio Gregor von Rezzori

Further reading
 Valentina Glajar: After Empire: 'Postcolonial' Bukovina in Gregor von Rezzori's 'Blumen im Schnee' (1989) . In: The German Legacy in East Central Europe as Recorded in Recent German-Language Literature. Columbia, SC: Camden House. 2004. 
Katarzyna Jaśtal, Erzählte Zeiträume. Kindheitserinnerungen aus den Randgebieten der Habsburgermonarchie von Manès Sperber, Elias Canetti und Gregor von Rezzori, Aureus, Kraków, 1998
Gerhard Köpf, Vor-Bilder. Tübinger Poetik-Vorlesung, Konkursbuchverlag, Tübingen, 1999
Jacques Lajarrige, Gregor von Rezzori. Etudes réunies, Université de Rouen, Centre d'Études et de Recherches Autrichiennes, Mont-Saint-Aignan, 2003
Gilbert Ravy, "Rezzori et la France", in Austriaca, No. 54 (2002), p. 41-58
Tetyana Basnyak. The mythologeme of East European culture in Gregor von Rezzori’s creative work. – Manuscript. Thesis for а scientific degree of Candidate of Philology. Speciality 10.01.04 – Literature of Foreign Countries. – T. H. Shevchenko Institute of Literature of the National Academy of Sciences of Ukraine.  – Kiev, 2010.
 Мусієнко І. В. Витоки особливостей ментальності Грегора фон Реццорі (за книгою "Квіти в снігу") / І. В. Мусієнко // Питання літературознавства : наук. зб. – Чернівці : Чернівецький нац. ун-т, 2000. – Вип. 6 (63). – С. 121–133. 

Notes

References
"Gregor von Rezzori at Institute as writer-in-residence; will speak Nov. 21", in MIT Tech Talk, Vol 41, Nr 12, November 20, 1996
W. Killy (ed.), Literaturlexikon, vol. 9, Lexikon Verlag, 2001
Th. Kraft (ed.), Lexikon der deutschsprachigen Gegenwartsliteratur seit 1945'', Nymphenburger, Munich, 2003

External links

Santa Maddalena Foundation
Review of Orient-Express
Review of Memoirs of an Anti-Semite

1914 births
1998 deaths
20th-century Romanian novelists
20th-century Austrian novelists
Austrian male short story writers
Austrian male writers
Austrian male film actors
Austrian untitled nobility
Austrian people of Italian descent
Romanian expatriates in Italy
Romanian nobility
Romanian male novelists
Romanian screenwriters
Romanian male short story writers
Romanian short story writers
Romanian journalists
Romanian memoirists
Romanian art critics
Romanian essayists
Romanian male film actors
Romanian writers in German
Stateless people
Austrian expatriates in Romania
Romanian people of Austrian descent
Romanian people of Italian descent
People of Sicilian descent
People from the Duchy of Bukovina
Writers from Chernivtsi
Yiddish-speaking people
20th-century Austrian male actors
Male screenwriters
Male essayists
20th-century short story writers
20th-century essayists
20th-century male writers
University of Leoben alumni
University of Vienna alumni
20th-century Austrian journalists
20th-century memoirists
20th-century screenwriters
Artists from Chernivtsi